Denham is a surname of Old English origin. It originally referred to those from Denham, Buckinghamshire, Denham, Suffolk and Denholme, Yorkshire. The name of Denham may have come from Brittany as "de Dinan" (Dinan is a walled town in North West France) and carried to Scotland by Alan, Baron de Dinan. (Probably with the William the Conquer). See The name "Denham" by Virginia Denham (Detroit 1940).

Notable persons with this name
 Dr. Alison Denham, Philosopher 
 Dr. Anne Denham, Surgeon
 Anthony Denham (born 1991), American football player
 Baron Denham
 Carl Denham, fictional character from King Kong
 Daryl Denham, British radio DJ
 Digby Denham (1859–1944), Australian politician
 Dixon Denham, British explorer
 Henry Denham, British printer
 Henry Mangles Denham, (1800–1887), Royal Navy officer and surveyor
 James Denham-Steuart, British economist
 Jeff Denham, U.S. Representative from California
 John Denham (poet) (1615–1669), English poet
 John Denham (politician) (born 1953), United Kingdom member of Parliament for Southampton Itchen
 Maurice Denham, British actor
 Robert N. Denham (1885–1954), American, general counsel to National Labor Relations Board
 Roy Denham, Vice President Halliburton
 Sean Denham, Australian rules footballer
 Susan Denham, Chief Justice of Ireland
 Thomas Denham

References

English toponymic surnames